Stigmella castanopsiella is a moth of the family Nepticulidae. It is only known from Honshū and Kyushu in Japan, but is probably also present in China.

Adults are on wing in March. There is probably one generation per year.

The larvae feed on Castanopsis cuspidata var. sieboldii. They mine the leaves of their host plant. The mine consists of a linear, upper surface gallery. The first half runs in a straight narrow line along the mid-rib towards the base of the leaf. The second half is made by the last instar larva and becomes broader and leaves the mid-rib. The colour of the narrow linear portion is reddish brown to whitish brown, filled with brownish grains of frass. The broad linear portion is yellowish brown, containing a narrow dark greenish mass of frass.

External links
Nepticulidae (Lepidoptera) in China, 1. Introduction and Stigmella (Schrank) feeding on Fagaceae
Japanese Species Of The Genus Stigmella (Nepticulidae: Lepidoptera)

Nepticulidae
Moths of Japan
Moths described in 1978